Frederick Purser (1839–30 January 1910) was an Irish mathematician, author, and member of the Royal Irish Academy.  He was a younger brother to mathematician John Purser.

Life and career
Born in Dublin, Frederick attended a boarding school run by his uncle Richard Biggs in Wiltshire, England, then attended Trinity College Dublin (TCD), where he was Scholar (1859), and got BA (1860) and MA (1864). He was elected a Fellow there in 1879. He was appointed Professor of Natural Philosophy in 1902 and served in the role until his death.  He contributed articles to the 1911 Encyclopedia Britannica.

References

19th-century Irish mathematicians
Alumni of Trinity College Dublin
Fellows of Trinity College Dublin
Members of the Royal Irish Academy
1839 births
1910 deaths